The WHO Adverse Reactions Terminology (WHOART) is a dictionary meant to serve as a basis for rational coding of adverse reaction terms. The system is maintained by the Uppsala Monitoring Centre (UMC), the World Health Organization Collaborating Centre for International Drug Monitoring. The system is no longer actively maintained.

Structure
 32 System-organ classesbody organ groups
 180 High level terms for grouping Preferred terms
 2085 Preferred terms principal terms for describing adverse reactions
 3445 Included terms synonyms to Preferred terms

See also
Pharmacovigilance
COSTART
MedDRA
Adverse event

References

WHO Adverse Reactions Terminology

Medical classification
Pharmacological classification systems